Zuckermann or Zuckerman is a Yiddish or German surname meaning "sugar man".

Zuckermann
 Ariel Zuckermann (born 1973), Israeli conductor
 Benedict Zuckermann (1818–1891), a German scientist born at Breslau
 Ghil'ad Zuckermann (born 1971), an Israeli/Italian/British linguist 
 Hugo Zuckermann (1881–1914), Jewish-Austrian poet
 Isidor Zuckermann (1866–1946), Austrian director timber and wood industrial company
 Wolfgang Zuckermann (1922–2018), German/American harpsichord maker

Zuckerman
 Adrian Zuckerman, British legal scholar
 Adrian Zuckerman (attorney) (born 1956), Romanian lawyer
 Allison Zuckerman (born 1990), American artist
 Andrea Zuckerman, fictional character
 Andrew Zuckerman (born 1977), American filmmaker
 Angela Zuckerman (born 1965), American speed skater
 Barry Zuckerman, American non-fiction writer
 Baruch Zuckerman (1887–1970), American-Israeli Zionistic activist, and early proponent of Yad Vashem
 Ben Zuckerman (1890-1979), American fashion designer
 Benjamin Zuckerman (born 1943), American astronomer
 Bernard Zuckerman (born 1943), American chess master
 Bob Zuckerman (born 1960), American politician
 Constantine Zuckerman (born 1957), French historian
 Cordero Zuckerman, American drag queen
 Diana Zuckerman (born 1950), American author
 Eli Zuckerman (born 1973), Israeli Olympic competitive sailor
 Ethan Zuckerman (born 1973), one of the founders of Tripod and later Geekcorps
 George Zuckerman (1916-1996), American screenwriter and novelist
 Gregg Zuckerman (born 1949), mathematician who introduced Zuckerman functors
 Gregory Zuckerman (born 1966), American journalist
 Harriet Zuckerman (born 1937), American sociologist
 Heidi Zuckerman, American museum curator
 Homer Zuckerman, owner of Wilbur the pig in Charlotte's Web
 Jeffrey Zuckerman (born 1987), Franco-American translator
 Jeremy Zuckerman (born 1975), American composer
 Joseph D. Zuckerman, American researcher
 Josh Zuckerman (born 1985), American actor (Austin Powers in Goldmember)
 Kathy Kohner-Zuckerman (born 1941), American surfer
 Laurel Zuckerman (born 1960), American author
 Lilla Zuckerman (born 1974), American television writer
 Lillian Zuckerman (1916-2004), American actress
 Marvin Zuckerman (1928–2018), American psychologist and researcher
 Miron Zuckerman (born 1945), American psychologist
 Molly Zuckerman-Hartung (born 1975), American painter
 Mortimer Zuckerman (born 1937), Canadian-American publisher, magazine editor, and real estate billionaire
 Nathan Zuckerman, a character from author Philip Roth's Zuckerman Bound series
 Nora Zuckerman, American television screenwriter
 Peter Zuckerman (born 1979), American journalist
 Phil Zuckerman (born 1969), American author
 Roni Zuckerman (born 1981), Israeli aircraft pilot
 Solly Zuckerman (1904–1993), a UK civil servant, zoologist, and scientific advisor
 Steve Zuckerman (born 1947), American television director
 Yehoshua Zuckerman (1938-2021), Israeli rabbi
 Yitzhak Zuckerman (1915-1981), Jewish resistance fighter in Nazi-occupied Poland

Czuckermann
 Lydia Hatuel-Czuckermann (born 1963), Israeli Olympic foil fencer

See also 
 Cukierman
 Zucker (disambiguation)
 Zuckerberg (surname)
 Zukerman

Jewish surnames
German-language surnames
Yiddish-language surnames